Kim Herford (born 22 February 1947) is an Australian former swimmer. She competed in the women's 400 metre freestyle at the 1964 Summer Olympics.

References

External links
 

1947 births
Living people
Olympic swimmers of Australia
Swimmers at the 1964 Summer Olympics
Swimmers from Sydney
Commonwealth Games medallists in swimming
Commonwealth Games bronze medallists for Australia
Swimmers at the 1966 British Empire and Commonwealth Games
Australian female freestyle swimmers
20th-century Australian women
Medallists at the 1966 British Empire and Commonwealth Games